Diachea leucopodia is a species of slime mold of the family Didymiaceae.

References

Myxogastria